Frank Mighty's Hotline is the stage name of John Traboulsi, a Canadian indie rock musician from Toronto, Ontario. Traboulsi released his debut single, "Intertwined" in 2019. In 2020, he released "Hold Me Down", premiering on Variance Magazine, which described his sound as "somewhere between Passion Pit and MGMT."

Wonderland drew comparisons of his music to Glass Animals and Bon Iver. His debut EP Whispersongs was released in 2021, and was mixed by Jacquire King.

References

21st-century Canadian male musicians
Canadian indie rock musicians
Musicians from Toronto
Living people
Year of birth missing (living people)